Jaffe Road is a road in Wan Chai and Causeway Bay, Hong Kong. It starts from Arsenal Street near Admiralty and ends at The Excelsior Hotel near World Trade Centre. It runs generally parallel to Gloucester and Lockhart roads.

Namesake

Jaffe Road was named after Daniel Joseph Jaffé in 1931, once the executive engineer of the former Public Works Department.

Buildings along the road
 Mass Mutual Tower
 Harcourt House
 Novotel Century Hong Kong
 Elizabeth House

See also
 List of streets and roads in Hong Kong

References

Roads on Hong Kong Island
Wan Chai
Causeway Bay
Restaurant districts and streets in Hong Kong